William H. Nickerson (born January 22, 1939) is an American politician from Connecticut. A member of the Republican Party, he served in the Connecticut House of Representatives from 1987 to 1991 and the Connecticut State Senate from 1991 to 2009.

Career

From 1969 until 1986, Nickerson served as the Greenwich Town Meeting Representative. In 1986, Nickerson ran for the House of Representatives and won. He served in the State House until 1990 when he was elected to the State Senate. He declined to seek another term to the State Senate in 2008.

Nickerson previously practiced law and was a member of the bars in Connecticut and New York.

In 2016, Nickerson endorsed John Kasich for President of the United States.

Education
Nickerson attended Harvard University and Columbia Law School.

Personal
Nickerson is from Greenwich, Connecticut. He has two adult children with his wife Jane.

References

External links

|-

1939 births
Columbia Law School alumni
Harvard University alumni
Living people
People from Greenwich, Connecticut
Republican Party Connecticut state senators
Republican Party members of the Connecticut House of Representatives
20th-century American politicians
21st-century American politicians